The Greatest Story Ever Told is a 1965 film based on
The Greatest Story Ever Told, a 1949 novel by Fulton Oursler, in turn based on
The Greatest Story Ever Told (radio program), a 1947–1956 series inspired by the Gospels

The Greatest Story Ever Told may also refer to:
The Greatest Story Ever Told (The Lawrence Arms album), 2003
The Greatest Story Ever Told (David Banner album), 2008
"Greatest Story Ever Told", a song on Bob Weir's 1972 album Ace
"The Greatest Story Ever Told", a song on Five Iron Frenzy's 2000 album All the Hype That Money Can Buy
"The Greatest Story Ever Told" (Aqua Teen Hunger Force Forever), the final episode of Aqua Teen Hunger Force
The Greatest Story Ever Told—So Far: Why Are We Here?, a 2017 book by Lawrence M. Krauss

Similar
The Greatest Story Never Told (disambiguation)
The Greatest Story Ever Sold (disambiguation)